Cento H.P. is a 1915 Italian film directed by Augusto Genina.

External links 
 

1915 films
Italian silent films
Films directed by Augusto Genina
Italian black-and-white films